Heléne Dahlberg (born 26 August 1971) is a Swedish biathlete. She competed in the women's relay event at the 1994 Winter Olympics.

References

External links
 

1971 births
Living people
Biathletes at the 1994 Winter Olympics
Swedish female biathletes
Olympic biathletes of Sweden
Place of birth missing (living people)
20th-century Swedish women